Liberty Township may refer to one of the following places in the State of Illinois:

 Liberty Township, Adams County, Illinois
 Liberty Township, Effingham County, Illinois

See also

 Libertyville Township, Lake County, Illinois
 Liberty Township (disambiguation)

Illinois township disambiguation pages